Laurel Hill, North Carolina can refer to:

 Laurel Hill, Scotland County, North Carolina, an unincorporated community
 Laurel Hill Township, North Carolina, a township in Scotland County
 Laurel Hill, Lincoln County, North Carolina, an unincorporated community